Brusilov (Russian: Брусилов) or Brusilova (feminine; Брусилова) is a Russian surname originating from the verb  meaning mumble. Notable people with the surname include:

Aleksei Brusilov (1853–1926), Russian cavalry general
Brusilov Offensive, Russian offensive during World War I
Georgy Brusilov (1884–c.1914), Russian naval officer and Arctic explorer
Brusilov Expedition in 1912–1914
Brusilov Nunataks in Antarctica
Lev Brusilov (1857–1909), Russian vice admiral and brother of Aleksei

See also
Brusyliv (disambiguation), Ukrainian variant of Brusilov
Brusilovski

References

Russian-language surnames